Mahakavi Pallath Raman (1892–1950), was a poet, writer, social reformer and community leader from Kerala, India. He was born in the city of Kochi, India. He was influenced by the teachings of Sree Narayana Guru. His most famous work was Amrita Pulinam, which fetched him many awards. He was a professor at Palakkad Victoria college and then Maharajas college cochin. His work had some influence from Western poetry and Rajput mythology. He was known for writing love poetry.

References

External links
 PRD Kerala

Narayana Guru
Writers from Kochi
Malayalam-language writers
Malayalam poets
1892 births
1950 deaths
Academic staff of Government Victoria College, Palakkad
Academic staff of Maharaja's College, Ernakulam
Indian social reformers
Poets from Kerala
Indian male poets